James Roy Gray (19 May 1926 – 31 October 2016) was an English first-class cricketer who played for Hampshire. He was a right-handed batsman and passed 2,000 runs in a season on three occasions. He made his highest score of 213 not out against Derbyshire during the 1962 season. He took more than 400 wickets for Hampshire including a career best of 7 for 52 against Glamorgan at Swansea in 1955. He died in Southampton in 2016, aged 90.

References

External links
Cricket Archive

1926 births
2016 deaths
English cricketers
Hampshire cricketers
Marylebone Cricket Club cricketers